MacHale Park is a GAA stadium in Castlebar, County Mayo, Ireland. It is the home of the Castlebar Mitchels GAA and Mayo GAA Gaelic football teams. Built in 1931, as of 2022 the ground has a capacity of approximately 28,000 and is named after John MacHale, Catholic Archbishop of Tuam from 1831 to 1881. It is the twelfth-biggest sports stadium in the Republic of Ireland by capacity and the second-biggest in the province of Connacht after Pearse Stadium in Galway; which is the home of Galway GAA.

History
Discussions with the owners of the land where MacHale Park now stands commenced in 1929 and the deal was concluded on 7 March 1930. In early 1931, development of the pitch took place at a cost of IR£1,700. The first competitive matches took place in MacHale Park on 22 March 1931 when Castlebar Mitchels minors played Balla and Ballina and Cloonacastle played a junior championship match. The first inter-county match was a National Football League match between Mayo and Sligo on 19 April 1931, Mayo winning by 0–7 to 0–2. The official opening took place on 24 May 1931, when about 4,000 spectators attended a match between Mayo and Kildare, which ended in a draw.

A major redevelopment was undertaken between 1950 and 1952 which raised the capacity of the ground to 40,000 with seating for 18,000 costing IR£15,000. The ground was reopened on 15 June 1952 with a game between the reigning All-Ireland champions Mayo and Meath; which also ended in a draw.

In the late 1980s, covered seating was provided in the Gerry McDonald Stand. In 1990 the Connacht Council decided to grant aid Dr. Hyde Park, County Roscommon with a view to making it the main venue in the province. In reaction to this a further redevelopment was embarked upon by the Castlebar Mitchels club. Over the course of the next 12 years, the ground was converted into a 32,000 all-seater stadium and new dressing rooms, improved press facilities, dug-outs and a wheelchair area were constructed.

In March 2005, the Mayo County Board took control of MacHale Park on a 50-year lease with a view to upgrading the stadium.

In 2008, construction work commenced on a detailed renovation of the ground, to include the construction of a new 10,000 seater stand as well as an extension to the seated area to the south (Albany) end of the ground. The €16 million redevelopment works included improved facilities for spectators, a museum, underground training areas, and County Board offices. As part of these works, the famous façade on the MacHale Road side of the ground was demolished. Funding for the project was generated by the sale of the naming rights for the stadium as well as the sale of season tickets for matches taking place at the ground.

In 2019, on health and safety reasons, capacity of MacHale Park was reduced by a further 6,000 to 25,369.

During the COVID-19 pandemic, MacHale Park was used as a drive-through test centre.

Its pitch has received some criticism and is set to be resurfaced sometime in 2021.

Notable MacHale Park matches
1934 National Football League final: Mayo 2–3 Dublin GAA 1–6.
This was the first League final played in MacHale Park. 8,000 attended the match which ended in a draw. Mayo won the replay in Croke Park by 2–4 to 1–5. It was the first of six League titles in-a-row for Mayo.

1952 Connacht Senior Football final: Roscommon GAA 3–5 Mayo 0–6.
This was the first Connacht final to take place in MacHale Park and the first big game there since the redevelopment. Mayo were coming off the back of two consecutive All-Ireland titles and four Connacht titles in a row. There was a journalists' strike on at the time and there were no reporters at the game. The result was sent by telegram to RTÉ to be read out on their evening GAA results programme. However, it was thought that a mistake must have been made and that Mayo could not have been beaten by an unfancied Roscommon. There was no way of checking this due to the journalists' strike, so the result was erroneously read out as Mayo 3–5 Roscommon 0–6.

1962 Connacht Senior Football final: Roscommon 3–7 Galway GAA 2–9.
Galway were well ahead when Aidan Brady broke the crossbar. A lengthy delay ensued while repairs were made. On the resumption the game changed completely and Roscommon turned things around to snatch a famous win.

1975 Connacht Senior Football final replay: Sligo 2–10 Mayo 0–15.
Many thought Sligo had missed their chance in the drawn match in Markievicz Park but inspired by Mickey Kearins, they won their first Connacht title in 47 years to spark joyous scenes among the Sligo supporters at the final whistle.

1981 Connacht Senior Football semi-final: Mayo 2–7 Galway 1–8.
Few gave Mayo, without a Connacht title for 12 years, any chance against arch-rivals Galway who had just been crowned League champions. However, on a blazing hot summer's day, a tremendous performance of high fielding by Willie Nally propelled Mayo to a famous victory and they would go on to clinch the Connacht title over Sligo, also at MacHale Park.

1991 Connacht Senior Football final: Roscommon 0–14 Mayo 0–14.
With time almost up, it appeared that Mayo had regained the title but Derek Duggan stepped up to kick a now-legendary long-range free to take the game to a replay.

1992 Connacht Senior Football final: Mayo 1–14 Roscommon 0–10.
Remarkably, the same MacHale Park crossbar was to be broken again in a Connacht final. Mayo were on top when Roscommon's Enon Gavin brought down the bar. However, there was to be no turnaround for Roscommon on this occasion and Mayo went on to comfortably regain the title.

2001 All-Ireland Senior Football quarter-final: Galway 0–14 Roscommon 1–5.
The first All-Ireland series match to take place in MacHale Park was an all-Connacht affair. The two sides had met earlier in the championship when Roscommon had shocked the defending Connacht champions. In the re-match Galway ran out convincing winners on their way to claiming the All-Ireland title.

2012 Connacht Senior Club Football final: Ballaghaderreen 0-6 vs St Brigid's 1-12.
Dubbed the "All-Rossie" Connacht final, St Brigids won an historic three-in-a-row provincial titles which was a platform to claiming the All-Ireland title four months later.

2013 Connacht Senior Football Final: Mayo 5-11 London 0-10.
History was made as London played in their first ever Connacht final. However Mayo won comfortably to claim a third Connacht title in a row.

See also
 List of Gaelic Athletic Association stadiums
 List of stadiums in Ireland

References

 MacHale Park 70th Anniversary Celebrations – Souvenir Programme, 13 May 2001

External links
 Mayo GAA Supporters
 GAA – Official Site
 Mayo GAA – Official Site
 Castlebar town

Castlebar
Gaelic games grounds in the Republic of Ireland
Mayo GAA
Sports venues in County Mayo